The 2022 Oceania Canoe Slalom Championships took place in Penrith, Australia from 28 to 30 January 2021 under the auspices of International Canoe Federation (ICF).

Competition format 
At the 2022 Oceania Championships was contested Open, U23 and Junior (U18) in the Men K1, Women K1, Men C1 and Women C1. All competitors had one heats qualification run and was ranked. Based on the ranking of the first qualification run, the following boats progressed directly to the semi-final: 30 K1M, 20 K1W, C1M, C1W. The remaining competitors in each event had a second heats qualification run and the following boats progressed to the semi-final: 10 K1M, K1W, C1M, C1W. Following the semi-final, the top 10 boats from each event progressed to the finals. All events was awarded in the Junior, U23 and Senior age
categories.

Schedule

Medal summary

References 

Oceania Canoe Slalom Championships
Oceania Canoe Slalom Championships
Oceania Canoe Slalom Championships